The 2019 Zimbabwe Premier Soccer League will be the 40th season of the Zimbabwe Premier Soccer League, the top-tier football in Zimbabwe. The season will start on 30 March 2019.

Teams
The league will consist of the top 14 teams from the 2018 Zimbabwe Premier Soccer League and four promoted sides, Hwange F.C., Manica Diamonds F.C., TelOne F.C, and Mushowani Stars F.C.

League table

References

2019 in African association football leagues
Zimbabwe Premier Soccer League
2019 in Zimbabwean sport